Hotel Florida Milan is a hotel in central Milan, Italy, located approximately 50 metres south of the Milano Centrale railway station in the "Stazione Centrale" district. The hotel was originally built in 1949 and was modernised in 2004. The hotel has Italian marble and  fine wood furnishings and has a private collection of contemporary art.

References

External links
Official site

Hotel buildings completed in 1949
Hotels in Milan
Hotels established in 1949
Railway hotels